Mahan is an unincorporated community in Fayette County, West Virginia, United States. Mahan is located off exit 66 of the West Virginia Turnpike.

The community was named after Peter Mahan, a businessperson in the lumber industry.

References

Unincorporated communities in Fayette County, West Virginia
Unincorporated communities in West Virginia
Coal towns in West Virginia